Goldie's tree cobra (Pseudohaje goldii), also (in error) known as Gold's tree cobra, is a species of venomous tree cobra (Pseudohaje means "false cobra") endemic to Central and Western Africa. This species is one of the two tree cobras in Africa, the other being the black tree cobra (Pseudohaje nigra). Goldie's tree cobra is one of the most venomous snakes and creatures in Africa.

Taxonomy
Belgian-British zoologist George Albert Boulenger described the species in 1895. The specific name, goldii, is in honor of George Taubman Goldie, a Manx administrator in Nigeria.

Description
The dorsal body color of this species is glossy black. It has a cylindrical body with a long, spiky tail, which makes the snake more adaptable to arboreal life. The head is small with exceptionally large eyes, giving the snake excellent eyesight. There are usually 15 rows of dorsal scales at midbody, though there are rare specimens that have 17 rows.

Distribution and habitat
Goldie's tree cobra can be found in Central and Western equatorial African countries, including Democratic Republic of the Congo, Republic of Congo, Gabon, Ghana, Cameroon, and Central African Republic. P. goldii inhabits forests and woodlands along rivers and streams. Being an arboreal species, it is seldom found in open land.

Behavior
Despite its large size, Goldie's tree cobra is a highly agile snake. It is equally comfortable in trees, on ground and in water. It can move quickly and gracefully through trees with the aid of its spiky tail. It is also a very secretive snake which is rarely seen by people. However, it is one of the few snakes that are considered aggressive. When threatened, it rears up and spreads a typical cobra hood, though its hood is much narrower than that of Naja naja. If it is further provoked, the snake may attempt to bite. Though it cannot spit its venom, its bite is very potent and potentially lethal. It is reputedly ill-tempered. It may also use its tail spike to defend itself if restrained.

Venom
Pseudohaje goldii venom is one of the most toxic and deadly of all African snakes. Venom of this species is primarily a neurotoxin, like most Elapidae. It is quick acting and extremely potent, easily killing a person. Moreover, there is no known specific antivenom made. Bite symptoms include swelling and stinging pain around the bite wound, numbness of limbs and lip, severe difficulty in breathing, sweating profusely and blurred vision. Victims may die of respiratory failure. A number of people are killed by this species.

Diet
Pseudohaje goldii mainly preys on amphibians and arboreal mammals, such as squirrels. It is also known to take fish occasionally.

Reproduction
Pseudohaje goldii is oviparous. The female will lay 10 to 20 eggs.

References

Further reading
Boulenger GA (1896). Catalogue of the Snakes in the British Museum (Natural History). Volume III., Containing the Colubridæ (Opisthoglyphæ and Proteroglyphæ) ... London: Trustees of the British Museum (Natural History). (Taylor and Francis, printers). xiv + 727 pp. + Plates I-XXV. (Naia goldii, pp. 387–388 + Plate XX, figure 2).
O'Shea, Mark; Halliday, Tim (2002). Reptiles and Amphibians: Smithsonian Handbooks. London: Dorling Kindersley (DK). 256 pp. .

External links
Pseudohaje goldii on www.afpmb.org

Goldie's tree cobra
Reptiles of Central Africa
Goldie's tree cobra